Igor Ivanović (born 28 July 1997) is a Serbian professional footballer who plays as an attacking midfielder.

Career
Ivanović started out with his hometown club Jagodina, making his Serbian SuperLiga debut in August 2014, aged 17. He was transferred to Napredak Kruševac in August 2017.

References

External links
 
 

1997 births
Living people
Sportspeople from Jagodina
Serbian footballers
Association football midfielders
Serbian expatriate footballers
Expatriate footballers in Belarus
FK Jagodina players
FK Napredak Kruševac players
FC Shakhtyor Soligorsk players
Serbian First League players
Serbian SuperLiga players